Yama is a Hindu and Buddhist deity of death, dharma, the south direction, and the underworld.

 Yama (Hinduism)
 Yama (Buddhism)

In Japanese, "Yama" means "mountain". For this reason, there are many place names with "-yama" in Japan. This word has no linguistic relationship to "Yama" in Hinduism or Buddhism.

Yama may also refer to:

Places 
 Yama, Burkina Faso
 Yama, Missouri, United States
 Yama District, Fukushima, Japan
 Yama (river), Magadan Oblast, Russia
 Yama, former name of Kingisepp, Russia
 The Pit (memorial) (Belarusian: Яма Yama), a Holocaust memorial at the Minsk Ghetto, Belarus

People 
 Anup Kumar Yama (born 1984), Indian roller skate athlete
 Conrad Yama  (1919–2010), American actor
 Gul Ahmmad Yama, Afghan presidential candidate
 Joam Yama (c. 1566 – 1633), Japanese Jesuit cleric
 Michael Yama (died 2020), American actor 
 Mihoko Yama (born 1949), Japanese high jumper
 Peter Yama (born 1955), Papua New Guinean politician
 Vladyslav Yama (born 1982), Ukrainian dancer
 Yamamotoyama Ryūta, or Yama, Japanese sumo wrestler

Other uses 
 Yāma, one of the six heavenly worlds in Buddhism
 Yamá, a trade language used by some Native American tribes around the Gulf of Mexico
 Yamas, ethical rules in Hinduism and Yoga
 Yama (album), by Art Farmer with Joe Henderson, 1979
 Yama: The Pit, a novel by Alexander Kuprin published in installments 1909–1915
 Yama, a Linux Security Module
 Yama, a song by Armin van Buuren & Vini Vici, 2021

See also

 Yamma (disambiguation)
 Yamna (disambiguation)
 Yam (disambiguation)

Japanese-language surnames